WITG-LP (104.7 FM, "Classic Hits 104.7") is a radio station broadcasting a classic hits music format. Licensed to Ocala, Florida, United States, the station is currently owned by WITG Radio Station, Inc.

References

External links

ITG-LP
Oldies radio stations in the United States
ITG-LP
Radio stations established in 2003
2003 establishments in Florida